The Sri Lankan Ordinary Level (O-level) is a General Certificate of Education (GCE) qualification in Sri Lanka, conducted by the Department of Examinations of the Ministry of Education. It is based on the Cambridge University Ordinary Level qualification. An O-level is a qualification of its own right, but more often taken in prerequisite for the more in-depth and academically rigorous Advanced Level exams. It is usually taken by students during the final two years of Senior secondary school (Grade 10 & 11 (usually ages 15–16)) or external (non-school) candidate. The exams are held in three mediums Sinhala, Tamil and English.

See also
 Education in Sri Lanka
 List of schools in Northern Province, Sri Lanka
 Sri Lankan universities
 Government Schools in Sri Lanka
 GCE Advanced Level in Sri Lanka

External links
Ministry of education
Department of Examination

Educational qualifications in Sri Lanka
School qualifications
School examinations